Guillermo Oropez (born February 7, 1947) is an American former professional tennis player.

Oropez was born in Corpus Christi, Texas and is of Mexican descent. A late comer to tennis at the age of 16, he played collegiate tennis for both the University of New Mexico and University of Nevada. He also spent time in New Jersey as a tennis pro. Turning professional in 1973, Oropez featured in the doubles main draw of the US Open on three occasions, the first time at Forest Hills and other two after the tournament moved to Flushing Meadows.

References

External links
 
 

1947 births
Living people
American male tennis players
Tennis people from Texas
Sportspeople from Corpus Christi, Texas
New Mexico Lobos athletes
Nevada Wolf Pack athletes
College men's tennis players in the United States
American sportspeople of Mexican descent